Lady Constance Stewart-Richardson (later Matthew; ; 1883–1932) was a British dancer and author.

Biography
She was a daughter of Francis Mackenzie Sutherland-Leveson-Gower, 2nd Earl of Cromartie (1852–1893) and sister of Sibell Lilian Blunt-Mackenzie, 3rd Countess of Cromartie (1878–1962). Her paternal grandparents were George Sutherland-Leveson-Gower, 3rd Duke of Sutherland, and Anne Hay-Mackenzie, 1st Countess of Cromartie.

In 1904, Constance married Sir Edward Austin Stewart-Richardson, 15th Baronet (1872–1914) and bore him two sons. She lived in Pitfour Castle in Perthshire.

In 1910 her semi-clad dancing for the "shilling seats" of theatres incurred the displeasure of Edward VII, who considered it unsuitable behaviour for a noblewoman, and she was barred from Court – which constituted social death.

In 1913 she danced in Judith in Vienna. The same year, she published Dancing, Beauty, and Games (1913). In September 1913 she arrived in New York to accompany the French actress Polaire on her American tour.

Her husband, an officer in the Black Watch, was killed in 1914 at the First Battle of Ypres. She went on to marry (in 1921 in London) Mr Dennis Leckie Matthew, an ex-guards officer who had spent several years in Chile pre-1914 observing German activities in South America for the British Government. He acted as a King's Messenger. They had a daughter, Anita, who was brought up (when both parents died in the early 1930s) by her Scottish half-family.

Publications

References

External links
Constance Stewart-Richardson from the Library of Congress at Flickr

1883 births
1932 deaths
19th-century Scottish women
20th-century British dancers
20th-century Scottish women
20th-century British writers
20th-century British women writers
20th-century Scottish writers
20th-century Scottish women writers
British exercise and fitness writers
Constance
Dance writers
Daughters of British earls
Scottish female dancers
Wives of baronets